M-LOK, for Modular Lock,  is a firearm rail interface system developed and patented by Magpul Industries. The license is free-of-charge, but subject to an approval process.

M-LOK allows for direct accessory attachment onto the "negative space" (hollow slot) mounting points, and is a competing standard to VLTOR's open sourced KeyMod system for replacing the ubiquitous Picatinny rail in some applications.  Compared to the Picatinny rail system, both M-LOK and KeyMod enable the user to have a slimmer, lighter, smoother and more fenestrated handguard/fore-end with accessories mounted only where needed, whereas a Picatinny handguard typically will have rail slots for its whole length, resulting in a heavier and bulkier handguard with sharp edges and poorer barrel ventilation.

The M-LOK system can be seen as an evolution of the Magpul Original Equipment (MOE) system, but the two are not fully compatible.  Though newer M-LOK accessories can be used on older MOE slot handguards if an adaptor plate is used, there is no adaptor available for using older MOE accessories on the newer M-LOK handguards.

History 

A prototype of the MOE slot was revealed by Magpul in late 2007 together with their Masada Concept Rifle (which would later be known as the Adaptive Combat Rifle).  The MOE slot system was released by Magpul in 2008 as a feature on their MOE handguards, and at the same time compatible accessories such as Picatinny rail sections, direct MOE mounted light mounts, grips, bipod studs, etc. were released.

The MOE slot standard was never officially released, and a drawback to the system was that the rear side of the panel had to be accessed in order to mount accessories, limiting its application.  The MOE slot system uses a weld nut which has to be placed manually on the inside of the handguard before mounting, making the slot system unsuited for applications such as free-floating handguards.  Also, depending on the accessory item, the spacing increments between the MOE slots were not small or uniform enough to adjust the desired placement of accessories.

Acknowledging shortcomings of the MOE systems, Magpul drafted M-LOK as a new and improved mounting standard which was released in 2014 replacing the existing MOE slot.  The M-LOK rail specification included metric dimensions instead of imperial, and utilizes a T-slot nut capable of only 90-degree rotation, reinforced by thread-locking fluid, making it suited for applications on free-floating handguards.  It was designed to work with both metal and polymer parts.

In 2016, Colt Canada developed and released the Modular Rail Rifle (MRR) that uses a monolithic upper receiver with the M-LOK attachment system.  In 2017, several companies produce M-LOK handguards as well as accessories like Picatinny rail strips, vertical foregrips, bipods, sling adaptors, and flashlight mounts.

In 2017, a summary report of testing conducted by NSWC-Crane for USSOCOM indicated that, while comparable in endurance and rough handling testing, M-LOK greatly outperformed Keymod in repeatability, drop testing and failure load testing.

Licensing 
While M-LOK is licensed free-of-charge, it is not open source, and thus manufacturers must acquire a license from Magpul before making products using the M-LOK standard.  Magpul claims this gives them more control in assuring that all M-LOK products are made to specifications ensuring compatibility.  Program participation is open to any interested manufacturer.

Note that although Magpul describes the license as a "free license", the meaning does not match the more common meaning originally established in computer circles. The computer "free license" refers to a freedom to use, while Magpul only conditionally offers the license for free (analogous to a source-available freeware).

Technical specifications

Rail specifications
The slot dimensions (used on handguards, etc.) are available on the web. The slots provide metric  length intervals, and accessories can be mounted either within a slot or bridging between slots, making it possible to adjust the position of accessories in smaller intervals than the length of the slot.

Attachment specifications
The quarter-turn T-slot nuts have different torque specifications depending on the handguard material:
  for attaching metal accessories to metal handguards.
  for attaching polymer or metal accessories to polymer handguards.
  for attaching polymer accessories to metal handguards.

Attachment screws made by many U.S. manufacturers are often either #8-32 TPI or 10-24 TPI UNC threads, which respectively have major thread diameters of 0.1640 inches and 0.1900 inches (4.166-0.794 mm and 4.826-1.058 mm expressed in metric designation). Many M-LOK screws on the international market instead use either M4 or M5 metric threads to reduce cost.

The tool required for mounting, in addition to the thread size, also depends the screw head type. Hex keys are used extensively in the firearms industry, but metric and imperial hex keys as a general rule are not compatible. It is possible to damage the tool and screw by selecting a tool that is too small for the fastener, which can be done by using an imperial tool on a metric fastener, or the converse. In many industries, this makes  hex keys preferred for consumer products because end users can successfully use an imperial key on a metric fastener, and vice versa.

While screw and slot dimensions are available on the web, the T-slot nut dimensions are currently under review by the US State Department to determine whether it should be regulated by ITAR, and until it is clarified drawings are only available to US citizens.

See also 
 KeyMod—competing standard open standard design to M-LOK for mounting accessories
 NATO Accessory Rail—further development from the MIL-STD-1913
 Picatinny rail (MIL-STD-1913)—improved and standardized version of the Weaver mount. Used for both for scope mounts, and for accessories (such as extra sling mounts, vertical grips, bipods etc.) Major popularity in the civilian market.
 Rail Integration System—generic term for a system for attaching accessories to small firearms
 SOPMOD
 UIT rail—an older standard used for mounting slings particularly on competition firearms
 Weaver rail mount—early system used for scope mounts, still has some popularity in the civilian market
 Zeiss rail—a ringless scope mounting standard

References 

 "KeyMod vs. M-LOK Modular Rail System Comparison", Presented by Caleb McGee, Naval Special Warfare Center Crane Division, 4 May 2017; Abstract #19427

External links 
 

Mechanical standards
Firearm components